Rodolfo Lombardo Ontiveros Gómez (born 9 November 1983) is a Mexican male volleyball and beach volleyball player.

References

External links
 profile at FIVB.org
 

1983 births
Living people
Mexican beach volleyball players
Mexican men's volleyball players
Men's beach volleyball players
Beach volleyball players at the 2016 Summer Olympics
Olympic beach volleyball players of Mexico
Sportspeople from Mazatlán
Beach volleyball players at the 2015 Pan American Games
Beach volleyball players at the 2019 Pan American Games
Pan American Games gold medalists for Mexico
Pan American Games silver medalists for Mexico
Medalists at the 2015 Pan American Games
Medalists at the 2019 Pan American Games
Pan American Games medalists in volleyball
21st-century Mexican people